St. Andrew's Parish was created as a civil parish in Kings County, Prince Edward Island, Canada, during the 1764–1766 survey of Samuel Holland.

It contains the following townships:

 Lot 59
 Lot 61
 Lot 63
 Lot 64

Parishes of Prince Edward Island
Geography of Kings County, Prince Edward Island